The use of Oyster pay as you go (PAYG) payment has now been implemented across National Rail services in the London Travelcard area (Zones 1–9), some additional stations served by c2c, Elizabeth line (not West Drayton to Reading), Govia Thameslink Railway, Greater Anglia, and London Overground, Southeastern highspeed services within London, as well as Gatwick Express and Heathrow Express.

Background
The Oyster card was launched in 2003 with the facility to hold season-ticket Travelcards, accepted on both London Underground and National Rail services. In January 2004, a PAYG product was launched for use on London Underground and DLR, but only a limited number of National Rail operators accepted the product on parts of their routes, usually because their tickets were interchangeable with London Underground ticketing under long-standing agreements.

In May 2006 TfL and the Department for Transport agreed a £20 million funding package for train operators to install the equipment necessary to accept PAYG at all London stations. The package was not taken up by any train operating companies and in September 2006, the South West Trains franchise was renewed by the Department for Transport with the condition that smartcard ticketing must be in place by 2009. In November 2007 the metro routes operated by Silverlink were brought under the control of TfL and operated under the brand name London Overground, accepting Oyster PAYG.

A necessary precursor of the acceptance of Oyster PAYG was the introduction of zonal single fares on the National Rail network in London; this was implemented in January 2007. Also in January, the then Mayor of London Ken Livingstone announced that he required operators to sign up by 31 January 2007 in order to receive the funding package offer. c2c and Chiltern Railways accepted the deal and on 31 January 2007, a commitment was made by ATOC, in principle, that all other operators would eventually accept the PAYG product. According to ATOC, roll-out plans were subject to the installation of suitable ticket gates and back office equipment at all 330 stations. It was expected that by February 2009 TfL would announce plans for all suburban trains to accept the card. In May 2009 London TravelWatch indicated it had discovered that the works were unlikely to be completed until 2010. On 23 November 2009 the GLA announced that from 2 January 2010 the vast majority of rail services in Greater London would accept Oyster PAYG.

Current acceptance and expansions planned 
The current acceptance and expansions planned are as follows:

Notes

See also
 Oyster card
 Smartcards on National Rail
 London fare zones

References

Fare collection systems in London
London Rail